This year also marks the start of the Second World War, the largest and deadliest conflict in human history.

Events
Below, the events of World War II have the "WWII" prefix.

January

 January 1 
 Nazi Germany
 Jews are forbidden to work with Germans.
 Coming into effect of: The Protection of Young Persons Act, passed on April 30, 1938; the Working Hours Regulations. 
 The small businesses obligation to maintain adequate accounting came into effect.  
 The Jews name change decree has gone into effect. 
 With his traditional call to the New Year, Führer and Reich Chancellor Adolf Hitler addressed the members of the National Socialist German Workers' Party (NSDAP).  
 The rest of the world
 In Spain, it becomes a duty of all young women under 25 to complete compulsory work service for one year.
 First Vienna New Year's Concert.
 The Hewlett-Packard technology and scientific instruments manufacturing company is founded in a garage in Palo Alto, California, by Bill Hewlett and David Packard, considered the birthplace of Silicon Valley.
 Sydney, in Australia, records temperature of 45 ˚C, the highest record for the city.
 Philipp Etter takes over as President of the Swiss Confederation. 
 Texas A&M became the US champion in college football.
 The Nobel Prize-winning nuclear physicist Enrico Fermi, along with his family, leaves Italy to move to exile in the United States.
 In Finland
 The densely populated settlement of Vähäheikkilä is abolished and transferred from the municipality of Kaarina to the city of Turku.
 The National Pension Act enters into force in Finland.
 Launch of the Third Soviet Five Year Plan.
 In the proposal of the Congregation of the Mosaic, the Swedish government approves the acceptance of about 1,000 Jews from Germany as refugees in transit. The parish is responsible for them and visa requirements are introduced for all non-Nordic refugees in country.
 January 5 – Pioneering US aviator Amelia Earhart is officially declared dead, eighteen months after her disappearance.
January 6 – Naturwissenschaften publishes Otto Hahn's discoveries in the field of nuclear fission.
 January 7 – French physicist Marguerite Perey identifies francium, the last chemical element first discovered in nature.
 January 14 – Norway claims Queen Maud Land in Antarctica.
 January 23 – "Dutch War Scare": Admiral Wilhelm Canaris of the Abwehr leaks misinformation to the effect that Germany plans to invade the Netherlands in February, with the aim of using Dutch air-fields to launch a strategic bombing offensive against Britain. The "Dutch War Scare" leads to a major change in British policies towards Europe.
 January 25 – Refik Saydam forms the new (11th) government of Turkey.
 January 26 
 Spanish Civil War: Spanish Nationalist troops, aided by Italy, take Barcelona.
 In Paris, French Foreign Minister Georges Bonnet, in response to rumours (which are true) that he is seeking to end the French alliance system in Eastern Europe, gives a speech highlighting his government's commitment to the cordon sanitaire.
 January 27 – Adolf Hitler orders Plan Z, a 5-year naval expansion programme intended to provide for a huge German fleet capable of crushing the Royal Navy by 1944. The Kriegsmarine is given the first priority on the allotment of German economic resources.
 January 30 – Hitler gives a speech before the Reichstag calling for an "export battle" to increase German foreign exchange holdings. The same speech also sees Hitler's "prophecy", where he warns that if "Jewish financiers" start a war against Germany, "the result will be the annihilation of the Jewish race in Europe".

February

 February 2 – Hungary joins the Anti-Comintern Pact.
 February 6
 British Prime Minister Neville Chamberlain states in the House of Commons that any German attack on France will be automatically considered an attack on Britain.
 In a response to Georges Bonnet's speech of January 26, German Foreign Minister Joachim von Ribbentrop, referring to Bonnet's alleged statement of December 6, 1938, accepting Eastern Europe as being in Germany's exclusive sphere of influence, protests that all French security commitments in that region are "now off limits".
 February 15 – John Ford's Western film Stagecoach starring John Wayne premieres in New York City and Los Angeles.
 February 18 – The Golden Gate International Exposition opens in San Francisco.
 February 27 – The United Kingdom and France recognize Franco's government.

March

 March – The 1936–39 Arab revolt in Palestine ends.
 March 1 – An Imperial Japanese Army ammunition dump explosion on the outskirts of Osaka kills 94.
 March 2 – Pope Pius XII (Cardinal Pacelli) succeeds Pope Pius XI to become the 260th pope.
 March 3 – In Durban, South Africa the Timeless Test begins between England and South Africa, the longest game of cricket ever played. It is abandoned 12 days later, when the English team has to catch their ship home.
 March 13 –Adolf Hitler advises Jozef Tiso to declare Slovakia's independence, in order to prevent its partition by Hungary and Poland.
 March 14 – The Slovak provincial assembly proclaims independence; priest Jozef Tiso becomes president of the independent Slovak government.
 March 15 – German troops occupy the remaining part of Bohemia and Moravia; Czechoslovakia ceases to exist. The Ruthenian region of Czechoslovakia declares independence as Carpatho-Ukraine.
 March 16
 Princess Fawzia Fuad of Egypt marries Shah Mohammad Reza Pahlavi of Iran.
 Hungary invades Carpatho-Ukraine; final resistance ends on March 18.
 March 17
 British Prime Minister Neville Chamberlain gives a speech in Birmingham, stating that Britain will oppose any effort at world domination on the part of Germany.
 The nationalist governments of Spain and Portugal sign the Iberian Pact in Lisbon, pledging mutual defence of the Iberian Peninsula and neutrality in the event of a general European war.
 March 20
 1939 German ultimatum to Lithuania, requiring return of the Klaipėda Region (Memel Territory) to Germany.
 At an emergency meeting in London to deal with the Romanian crisis, French Foreign Minister Georges Bonnet suggests to Lord Halifax that the ideal state for saving Romania from a German attack is Poland.
 March 21 – Aleister Crowley's Eight Lectures on Yoga is published by the Ordo Templi Orientis in London.
 March 22
 Following the March 20 ultimatum, Nazi Germany is granted the Klaipėda Region (Memel Territory, Memelland) by Lithuania; on the following day German forces occupy the territory.
 In the U.S., undefeated LIU Brooklyn Blackbirds men's basketball team tops undefeated Loyola of Chicago in the championship game of the second annual National Invitation Tournament, 44–32. LIU's 24–0 final record is the first perfect season of college basketball's postseason tournament era.
 March 23 – The Slovak–Hungarian War begins.
 March 26 – Final offensive of the Spanish Civil War launched by the Nationalists.
 March 27 – The University of Oregon defeats Ohio State University 46–33 in Evanston, Illinois, to win the championship of the first NCAA men's basketball tournament.
 March 28
 General Francisco Franco assumes power in Madrid, remaining in power until his death in 1975.
 American adventurer Richard Halliburton delivers a last message from a Chinese junk, before he disappears on a voyage across the Pacific Ocean. In 1945, some wreckage identified as a rudder, and believed to belong to the junk, washes ashore in San Diego, California.
 March 31 – Neville Chamberlain gives a speech in the House of Commons, offering the British "guarantee" of the independence of Poland.

April

 April 1 – The Spanish Civil War comes to an end when the last of the Republican forces surrender.
 April 3
 Adolf Hitler orders the German military to start planning for Fall Weiß, the codename for the invasion of Poland.
 Refik Saydam forms the new government in Turkey (12th government; Refik Saydam has served twice as a prime minister).
 April 4
 Faisal II becomes King of Iraq aged three, following the death of his father, Ghazi, in an automobile incident.
 The Slovak–Hungarian War ends, with Slovakia ceding eastern territories to Hungary.
 Polish Foreign Minister Colonel Józef Beck, in London, signs a treaty designed to bilateralize Neville Chamberlain's "Polish Guarantee" of March 31.
 April 7 
 Italy invades Albania; King Zog flees.
 Joseph Lyons, 10th Prime Minister of Australia, dies in office from a heart attack at the age of 59. He is briefly replaced by his deputy Earle Page, who serves as the 11th Prime Minister, until a UAP leadership election is held to replace Lyons. 
 April 9 – African-American singer Marian Anderson performs before 75,000 people at the Lincoln Memorial in Washington, D.C., after having been denied the use both of Constitution Hall by the Daughters of the American Revolution, and of a public high school by the federally controlled District of Columbia. First Lady of the United States Eleanor Roosevelt resigns from the DAR because of their decision.
 April 11 – Hungary leaves the League of Nations.
 April 14 – At a meeting in Paris, French Foreign Minister Georges Bonnet meets with Soviet Ambassador Jakob Suritz, and suggests that a "peace front" comprising France, the Soviet Union, Great Britain, Poland and Romania would deter Germany from war.
 April 18 
 The Soviet Union proposes a "peace front" to resist aggression.
 Robert Menzies is elected leader of the United Australia Party, and consequently becomes the 12th Prime Minister of Australia, defeating former Prime Minister Billy Hughes. However, he will not be sworn in until April 26, due to Earle Page and his Country Party refusing to serve under him.
 April 20 – Billie Holiday records "Strange Fruit", the first anti-lynching song, in the United States.
 April 25 – The Federal Security Agency (FSA) is founded in the United States, along with the Civilian Conservation Corps and Public Health Service.
 April 28 – In a speech before the Reichstag, Adolf Hitler renounces the Anglo-German Naval Agreement and the German–Polish declaration of non-aggression.
 April 30 – The 1939 New York World's Fair opens.

May

 May 1 – Batman, the fictional character created by Bill Finger and Bob Kane, makes his first appearance in Detective Comics #27.
 May 3
 Vyacheslav Molotov succeeds Maxim Litvinov, as Soviet Foreign Commissar.
 The All India Forward Bloc is formed by Netaji Subhas Chandra Bose.
 May 6 – Carl Friedrich Goerdeler tells the British government that the German and Soviet governments are secretly beginning a rapprochement, with the aim of dividing Eastern Europe between them. Goerdeler also informs the British of German economic problems which he states threaten the survival of the Nazi regime, and advises that if a firm stand is made for Poland, then Hitler will be deterred from war.
 May 9 – Spain leaves the League of Nations.
 May 14 – Lina Medina, a 5-year-old Peruvian girl, gives birth to a baby boy, becoming the youngest confirmed mother in medical history.
 May 17
 King George VI and Queen Elizabeth arrive in Quebec City, to begin the first-ever tour of Canada by Canada's monarch.
 The British government issues the White Paper of 1939, sharply restricting Jewish immigration to Mandatory Palestine.
 Sweden, Norway, and Finland refuse Germany's offer of non-aggression pacts.
 May 18 – The Hòa Hảo religious sect is established in Vietnam, by Huỳnh Phú Sổ.
 May 20 – Pan American Airways begins transatlantic mail service with the inaugural flight of its Boeing 314 flying boat Yankee Clipper from Port Washington, New York, to Marseille.
 May 22 – Germany and Italy sign the Pact of Steel.
 May 24 – The first issue of Fashizmi is published in Tirana, Albania.
 May 29 – Albanian fascist leader Tefik Mborja is appointed as member of the Italian Chamber of Fasces and Corporations.

June 

 June 3 – The Soviet government offers its definition of what constitutes "aggression", upon which the projected Anglo-Soviet-French alliance will come into effect. French Foreign Minister Georges Bonnet accepts the Soviet definition of aggression at once. The British reject the Soviet definition, especially the concept of "indirect aggression", which they feel is too loose a definition, and phrased in such a manner as to imply the Soviet right of inference in the internal affairs of Eastern European nations.
 June 4 – The St. Louis, a ship carrying a cargo of 907 Jewish refugees, is denied permission to land in Florida, after already having been turned away from Cuba. Forced to return to Europe, many of its passengers later die in Nazi death camps during The Holocaust.
 June 10 – MGM's first successful animated character, Barney Bear, makes his debut in The Bear That Couldn't Sleep. However, it is not until 1942 that his name is adopted.
 June 12 – The National Baseball Hall of Fame and Museum is officially dedicated in Cooperstown, New York.
 June 14 – Tientsin Incident: The Japanese blockade the British concession in Tianjin, China, beginning a crisis which almost causes an Anglo-Japanese war in the summer of 1939.
 June 17 – In the last public guillotining in France, murderer Eugen Weidmann is executed.
 June 23 – Talks are completed in Ankara between French Ambassador René Massigli and Turkish Foreign Minister Şükrü Saracoğlu, resolving the Hatay dispute in Turkey's favor. Turkey annexes Hatay.
 June 24 – The government of Siam changes its name to Thailand, which means 'Free Land'.
 June 29 – The Ford 9N tractor, with the Ferguson hydraulic three-point hitch, is first demonstrated at Dearborn, Michigan.

July 

 July 4 – The Neuengamme concentration camp becomes autonomous.
 July 6 – The last remaining Jewish enterprises in Germany are closed by the Nazis.
 July 8 – The Pan American Airways Boeing 314 flying boat Yankee Clipper inaugurates the world's first heavier-than-air North Atlantic air passenger service, between the United States (Port Washington, New York) and Britain.
 July 23 – Mahatma Gandhi writes a personal letter to Adolf Hitler from India, addressing him as "My friend", requesting him to prevent any possible war.
 July 27 – The first recorded snow falls in Auckland, New Zealand, since records began in 1853.

August 

 August 2 – The Einstein–Szilard letter is signed by Albert Einstein, advising President of the United States Franklin D. Roosevelt of the potential use of uranium to construct an atomic bomb. It is delivered on October 11 and leads to the first meeting on October 21 of the Advisory Committee on Uranium.
 August 4 – Prime Minister Neville Chamberlain dismisses the Parliament of the United Kingdom until October 3.
 August 15 – MGM's classic color musical film The Wizard of Oz, based on L. Frank Baum's famous novel of 1900, and starring Judy Garland as Dorothy, premieres at Grauman's Chinese Theatre in Hollywood. On August 25 it is released in movie theaters throughout the United States.
 August 19 – Adolf Hitler, after evaluating the pace of non-aggression negotiations with the Soviet Union, orders the Kriegsmarine to begin the opening operations for Fall Weiß, the invasion of Poland. Hitler spends the next few days worrying that the Russians will not come to terms in time for the rest of the invasion plans to unfold as scheduled.
 August 20 – Armored forces under the command of Soviet General Georgy Zhukov deliver a decisive defeat to Imperial Japanese Army forces in the Japanese-Soviet border war in Inner Mongolia.
 August 23 – The Molotov–Ribbentrop Pact is signed between Germany and the Soviet Union, a neutrality treaty that also agrees to division of spheres of influence (Finland, Estonia, Latvia, eastern Poland and Bessarabia (modern-day Moldova), north-east province of Romania to the Soviet Union; Lithuania and western Poland to Germany). Its annex reassigns Lithuania to the Soviet Union.
 August 24 – As details of the Molotov–Ribbentrop Pact become public, British Prime Minister Neville Chamberlain recalls the Parliament of the United Kingdom several weeks early. In a burst of legislation, the Emergency Powers (Defence) Act 1939 gives full authority to defence regulations, the British Royal Navy is to be put on a war footing, all military leave is to be cancelled, military reserve forces are to be called up, especially coast defence, radar and anti-aircraft units, and Civil Defence workers are placed on alert. In addition, the last British and French private citizens in Germany are advised to return home by their respective Governments.
 August 25 
 The German Foreign Ministry cuts off all telegraph and telephone communication with the outside world, in accordance with the plan for Fall Weiß. At approximately 1830 Central European time, Adolf Hitler postpones Fall Weiß for 5 days, after receiving a message from Benito Mussolini that he will not honor the Pact of Steel if Germany attacks Poland, and because Chamberlain's government has not fallen as a result of the German-Soviet Non-Aggression Pact. Some units already in their forward positions (the attack is scheduled for 0430 the next day) do not get the word in time and attack various targets along the border. This same day, Neville Chamberlain gives Edward Rydz-Śmigły his "ironclad guarantee" of assistance if Poland is attacked by Germany.
 1939 Coventry bombing: An Irish Republican Army bomb explodes in the centre of Coventry, England, killing 5 people.
 August 26
 The first televised Major League Baseball games are shown on experimental station W2XBS in the United States: a double-header between the Cincinnati Reds and the Brooklyn Dodgers at Ebbets Field.
 The Kriegsmarine orders all German-flagged merchant ships to head to German ports immediately, in anticipation of the invasion of Poland.
 August 27 – A Heinkel He 178, the first turbojet-powered aircraft, flies for the first time, with Captain Erich Warsitz in command.
 August 28 – French ocean liner  heads into New York Harbor, where she will be interned on September 3, and cut up for scrap, beginning in 1946.
 August 30 – Poland begins a mobilization against Nazi Germany.
 August 31 – Operation Himmler: Nazi German troops posing as Poles stage a series of false flag operations on the border (including the Gleiwitz incident), giving a pretext for the invasion of Poland.

September 

 September 1 – Beginning of WWII:
 Opening shots of World War II and invasion of Poland: At 4:45am Central European Time, under cover of darkness, the German WWI-era battleship Schleswig-Holstein quietly slips her moorings at her wharf in Danzig Harbor, drifts into the center of the channel, and commences firing on a Polish military installation on Westerplatte at the northeastern mouth of the port of the internationalized Free City of Danzig, beginning the Battle of Westerplatte and Battle of Danzig Bay. Five minutes previously, the bombing of Wieluń in the western part of Poland had commenced, beginning the Battle of the Border. Shock-troops of the German Wehrmacht begin crossing the border into Poland.
 The Reichstag passes a statement, stating that Adolf Hitler's second-in-command Reichsmarschall Hermann Göring should be appointed as Hitler's successor as Führer, should Hitler die during the war. Rudolf Hess is to be appointed in Göring's place, should anything befall Göring.
 Britain and France deliver ultimatums to Germany. Norway, Finland, Sweden and Switzerland declare their neutrality. U.S. President Franklin D. Roosevelt states that "every effort" would be made by his administration to stay out of the war. Italy is advised that Germany does not expect to need its military support at present.
 General George C. Marshall becomes Chief of Staff of the United States Army.
 September 2 – WWII:
 Following the invasion of Poland, the Free City of Danzig (modern-day Gdańsk, Poland) is annexed to Nazi Germany.
 Spain and Ireland declare their neutrality.
 September 3 – WWII:
 The United Kingdom, France, New Zealand, Australia and India (by its Viceroy) declare war on Nazi Germany. Prime Minister of Canada Mackenzie King, in English, and Justice Minister Ernest Lapointe, in French, give an international radio address stating the Dominion's intention to declare war also.
 United States President Franklin D. Roosevelt advocates neutrality, in a nationwide radio address.
Of the 1,418 aboard, 98 passengers and 19 crew are killed.
 Chamberlain offers the war cabinet post of First Lord of the Admiralty to Winston Churchill, who returns to government for the first time since June 4, 1929.
 September 4 – WWII:
 The first bombing of Wilhelmshaven in World War II is carried out, by the British Royal Air Force.
 The Defense of Katowice by irregular Polish militia fails and the city is secured by German Wehrmacht forces who carry out the Katowice massacre.
 Nepal declares war on Germany.
 September 5 – WWII: The United States declares its neutrality in the war.
 September 6 – WWII: South Africa declares war on Germany.
 September 8
 WWII: Forward elements of General Hoeppner's XVI Panzerkorps take up positions outside Warsaw. The world is stunned by the rapidity of the German advance, and the Polish High Command is effectively isolated, but lack of infantry support and effective civilian resistance cause Hoeppner to halt outside the city itself.
 WWII: Battle of Westerplatte ends when Polish troops on the Westerplatte are forced by lack of food and ammunition to surrender. The garrison of about two hundred had held out against thousands of German forces (many of them naval officer cadets from Schleswig-Holstein) for seven days.
 The Little Sisters of Jesus is founded in Algeria, by Little Sister Magdeleine.

 September 9 – WWII: Troops of the Polish Poznań Army under the command of General Kutrzeba open the Battle of the Bzura, the largest and best organized counter-attack mounted by the Polish forces in the campaign of 1939. For the first few days all goes well, and the Germans are forced to retreat; but quick reaction by mechanized units and the Luftwaffe soon take their toll, and the operation bogs down.
 September 10 – WWII: Canada declares war on Germany, the only declaration of war by Canada.
 September 13–14 – WWII: Zambrów massacre – German Wehrmacht soldiers shoot more than 200 Polish prisoners of war.
 September 15 – WWII: Diverse elements of the German Wehrmacht surround Warsaw, and demand its surrender. The Poles refuse, and the siege begins in earnest.
 September 16 – A ceasefire ends the Battles of Khalkhin Gol, the undeclared border war between the Soviet Union (and Mongolian allies) and Japan.
 September 17 – WWII:
 The Soviet Union invades Poland, and then occupies eastern Polish territories.
 September 18 – WWII: Orzeł incident: Polish submarine ORP Orzeł escapes internment from Tallinn Harbour, Estonia, leading both the Soviet Union and Germany to question Estonia's neutrality.
 September 19 – WWII: The Poznan pocket collapses, and the Germans capture, according to many sources, over 150,000 men. Many elements of General Tadeusz Kutrzeba's forces work their way into Warsaw, under extreme difficulty.
 September 21
Reinhard Heydrich, chief of the Security Police, sends a directive, the Schnellbrief, explaining that Jews living in towns and villages in the Polish occupation zones are to be transferred to ghettos, and Jewish councils, Judenräte, will be established to carry out the German authorities' orders.
Assassination of Armand Călinescu: Prime Minister of Romania Armand Călinescu is shot in Bucharest by members of the fascist Iron Guard.
WJSV broadcast day: Radio station WJSV in Washington, D.C. records an entire broadcast day for preservation in the United States National Archives.
 September 22 – WWII: A joint victory parade is staged by the Wehrmacht and Red Army in Brest-Litovsk, at the end of the Invasion of Poland.
 September 24 – WWII: The Soviet Union issues an ultimatum to Estonia to allow Soviet military bases on its territory, which Estonia accepts on September 28. Similar ultimatums are issued to Latvia on October 5 and to Lithuania on October 10, who are forced to accept them as well.
 September 28 – WWII:
 Nazi Germany and the Soviet Union agree on a division of Poland, after their invasion.
 Warsaw surrenders to Germany; Modlin surrenders a day later; the last Polish large operational unit surrenders near Kock 8 days later.
 September 30 – General Władysław Sikorski becomes Prime Minister of the Polish government-in-exile.

October 

 October 6 – WWII: The Battle of Kock ends the Polish Campaign. Polish resistance moves underground.
 October 7 – WWII: British Royal Navy cruiser  departs Plymouth in convoy for Halifax, Nova Scotia, carrying £2M in gold bar to be used for purchase of military materiel in North America, a predecessor of Operation Fish.
 October 8
 WWII: Germany annexes Western Poland.
 The Holocaust: Piotrków Trybunalski Ghetto, the first Jewish ghetto in Nazi-occupied Europe, is proclaimed in German-occupied Poland.
 October 14 –  sinks the British battleship  at anchor in Scapa Flow (Scotland), with the loss of 833 crew.
 October 15 – The New York Municipal Airport (later renamed LaGuardia Airport) is dedicated.
 October 21 – The first meeting of the U.S. Advisory Committee on Uranium is held under Lyman James Briggs, authorized by President Roosevelt to oversee neutron experiments, a precursor of the Manhattan Project.
 October 22 – In the first televised NFL football game, the Brooklyn Dodgers defeat the Philadelphia Eagles 23–14 at Ebbets Field.
 October 24 – Nylon stockings go on sale for the first time anywhere in Wilmington, Delaware.

November 

 November – Lebensborn: Policy of kidnapping of children by Nazi Germany initiated in occupied Poland.
 November 1–2 – WWII: Physicist Hans Ferdinand Mayer writes the Oslo Report on German weapons systems, and passes it to the British Secret Intelligence Service.
 November 4 – WWII: U.S. President Franklin D. Roosevelt orders the United States Customs Service to implement the Neutrality Act of 1939, allowing cash-and-carry purchases of weapons to non-belligerent nations.
November 4 – Stewart Menzies is appointed head of the British Secret Intelligence Service.
 November 6
 Hedda Hopper's Hollywood debuts on radio with gossip columnist Hedda Hopper as host (the show runs until 1951, making Hopper a powerful figure among the Hollywood elite).
 WWII: Sonderaktion Krakau: Germans take action against scientists from the University of Kraków, and other Kraków universities.
 November 8
 WWII: In Munich, an attempt to kill Adolf Hitler is made by Georg Elser, while Hitler is celebrating the 16th anniversary of the Beer Hall Putsch.
 CBS television station W2XAB resumes test transmission, with an all-electronic system broadcast from the top of the Chrysler Building in New York City.
 November 9 – WWII: Venlo Incident: Two British agents of SIS are captured by the Germans.
 November 14 – In Washington, D.C., U.S. President Franklin D. Roosevelt lays the cornerstone of the Jefferson Memorial.
 November 16 – Al Capone is released from Terminal Island, due to deteriorating health caused by syphilis.
 November 17 – WWII: To punish protests against the Nazi occupation of the Czech homeland, the Nazis storm the University of Prague and murder 9 Czech graduate students, send over 1,200 to concentration camps, and close all Czech universities, an event which will be commemorated as International Students' Day.
 November 26 – Shelling of Mainila: The Soviet Union's Red Army shells the Russian village of Mainila, then claims that the fire originated from Finland, giving a casus belli for the Winter War.
 November 30 – WWII:
 Winter War: Soviet forces attack Finland and reach the Mannerheim Line, starting the war.
 Sweden declares itself a non-belligerent in the Winter War.

December 

 December 2 – LaGuardia Airport opens for business in New York City.
 December 4 – WWII:
 British battleship  strikes a mine (laid by ) off the coast of Scotland, and is laid up for repairs until August 1940.
 German submarine U-36 is torpedoed and sunk by British submarine HMS Salmon off Stavanger, the first enemy submarine lost to a British one during the war.
 December 9 – WWII: The first soldier of the British Expeditionary Force is killed; Corporal Thomas Priday triggers a French land mine.
 December 13 – WWII – Battle of the River Plate: The German heavy cruiser Admiral Graf Spee is trapped by cruisers , HMNZS Achilles, and  after a running battle off the coast of Uruguay. Graf Spee is scuttled by its crew off Montevideo Harbor, on December 17.
 December 14 – WWII – Winter War: The League of Nations expels the USSR for attacking Finland.
 December 15 – The epic historical romance film Gone with the Wind, starring Vivien Leigh, Clark Gable, Olivia de Havilland and Leslie Howard, premieres at Loew's Grand Theatre in Atlanta. Based on Margaret Mitchell's best-selling novel of 1936, it is the longest American film made up to this date (at nearly four hours) and rapidly becomes the highest-grossing film up to this time.
 December 18 – WWII – Battle of the Heligoland Bight: RAF Bomber Command, on a daylight mission to attack Kriegsmarine ships in the Heligoland Bight, is repulsed by Luftwaffe fighter aircraft.
 December 26 – Miners strike in Borinage, Belgium.
 December 27 – The 7.8  Erzincan earthquake shakes eastern Turkey with a maximum Mercalli intensity of XII (Extreme), causing $20 million in damage, and leaving 32,700–32,968 dead.

Date unknown 
 Kirlian photography is invented by Semyon Kirlian.
 Enzo Ferrari founds Auto Avio Construzioni, the company that becomes Ferrari in 1947.

Births

January–February

 January 1 – Ali Mahdi Muhammad, Somali entrepreneur, politician and 4th President of Somalia (d. 2021)
 January 3
 Arik Einstein, Israeli singer (d. 2013)
 Bobby Hull, Canadian ice hockey player (d. 2023)
 Vincent Siew, Taiwanese politician, 9th Vice President of the Republic of China
 January 6
 Valeriy Lobanovskyi, Ukrainian footballer, manager (d. 2002)
 Murray Rose, Australian swimmer (d. 2012)
 January 9 – Susannah York, British actress (d. 2011)
 January 10
 Sal Mineo, American actor (d. 1976)
 Bill Toomey, American athlete
 January 11 – Anne Heggtveit, Canadian skier
 January 12 – Joachim Yhombi-Opango, Congolese politician (d. 2020)
 January 17 – Maury Povich, American talk show host
 January 19 – Phil Everly, American rock 'n' roll musician (member of Rockabilly Hall of Fame) (d. 2014)
 January 20 – Chandra Wickramasinghe, British astronomer and poet
 January 22
 Sonny Chiba, Japanese actor and martial artist (d. 2021)
 Alfredo Palacio, 42nd President of Ecuador
 January 24 – Ray Stevens, American musician (Everything is Beautiful)
 January 29 – Germaine Greer, Australian feminist writer
 February 1 – Ekaterina Maximova, Russian ballerina (d. 2009)
 February 3 – Michael Cimino, American film director (d. 2016)
 February 7 – Francisco Mendes, Guinea-Bissau politician, 1st Prime Minister of Guinea-Bissau (d. 1978)
 February 8 – Egon Zimmermann, Austrian Olympic alpine skier (d. 2019)
 February 10
 Adrienne Clarkson, 26th Governor General of Canada
 Tsuyoshi Yamanaka, Japanese freestyle swimmer (d. 2017)
 February 12 – Ray Manzarek, American keyboardist (The Doors) (d. 2013)
 February 13 – Andrew Peacock, Australian politician (d. 2021)
 February 18 – Abdelraouf Al-Rawabdeh, Jordanian political figure, 65th Prime Minister of Jordan
 February 19 – Erin Pizzey, British author, founder of the first domestic violence shelter in the modern world
 February 28 – Daniel C. Tsui, Chinese-born physicist, Nobel Prize laureate

March–April

 March 1 – Tzvetan Todorov, Bulgarian-French historian, philosopher, structuralist literary critic, sociologist and essayist (d. 2017)
 March 2 – Takako, Princess Suga
 March 5
 Samantha Eggar, English actress
 Chögyam Trungpa, Buddhist meditation master (d. 1987)
 March 8 – Lidiya Skoblikova, Russian speed-skater
 March 10 – Lee Soo-sung, 27th Prime Minister of South Korea
 March 13 – Neil Sedaka, American singer-songwriter
 March 14 – Glauber Rocha, Brazilian film director, actor and screenwriter (d. 1981)
 March 17 – Giovanni Trapattoni, Italian footballer and manager
 March 20 – Brian Mulroney, 18th Prime Minister of Canada
 March 25 – D. C. Fontana, American television writer (d. 2019)
 March 29 – Terence Hill, Italian actor
 March 31
 Zviad Gamsakhurdia, President of Georgia (d. 1993)
 Volker Schlöndorff, German film director
 Karl-Heinz Schnellinger, German footballer
 April 1 – Ali MacGraw, American actress 
 April 2 – Marvin Gaye, American singer (d. 1984)
 April 4 
 Alex George, Australian botanist
 Hugh Masekela, South African trumpeter, flugelhornist, cornetist, composer and singer (d. 2018) 
 Ernie Terrell, African-American professional boxer (d. 2014)
 April 7
 Sir David Frost, English television personality (d. 2013)
 Francis Ford Coppola, American film director
 April 9 – Michael Learned, American actress
 April 10 – Claudio Magris, Italian author
 April 12 – Alan Ayckbourn, English dramatist
 April 13 – Seamus Heaney, Irish writer, Nobel Prize laureate (d. 2013)
 April 15 – Jaime Paz Zamora , 60th President of Bolivia
 April 16 – Dusty Springfield, English pop singer (d. 1999)
 April 19 – Ali Khamenei, Supreme Leader of Iran
 April 20 – Gro Harlem Brundtland, Norwegian politician, 1st female Prime Minister
 April 21 – Helen Prejean, American writer
 April 23 – Lee Majors, American actor
 April 27 – João Bernardo Vieira, President of Guinea-Bissau (d. 2009)

May–June 

* May 1 – Judy Collins, American singer-songwriter
 May 2 
 Sumio Iijima, Japanese physicist and inventor
 Taomati Iuta, Vice President of Kiribati (1991–94) (d. 2016)
 May 4 – Amos Oz, Israeli author and journalist (d. 2018)
 May 7
 José Antonio Abreu, Venezuelan orchestral conductor, music educator (d. 2018)
 Sidney Altman, Canadian-born chemist, Nobel Prize laureate (d. 2022)
 Ruud Lubbers, Dutch politician, Prime Minister of the Netherlands (1982–94) (d. 2018)
 May 9 – Ralph Boston, American athlete
 May 13 – Harvey Keitel, American actor
 May 15 – Barbara Hammer, American filmmaker (d. 2019)
 May 18 – Peter Grünberg, German physicist, Nobel Prize laureate (d. 2018)
 May 19
 Livio Berruti, Italian sprinter
 James Fox, English actor
 Nancy Kwan, American actress
 Dick Scobee, American astronaut (d. 1986)
 May 20 – Roman Kartsev, Russian actor (d. 2018)
 May 21 – Heinz Holliger, Swiss oboist, composer
 May 22 – Paul Winfield, African-American actor (d. 2004)
 May 25
 Dixie Carter, American actress (d. 2010)
 Sir Ian McKellen, English actor
 May 27 – Don Williams, American musician (d. 2017)
 May 29 – Maeve Binchy, Irish author (d. 2012)
 May 30 – Michael J. Pollard, American actor (d. 2019)
 June 1 – Cleavon Little, African-American actor (d. 1992)
 June 4 – Ottavio Cogliati, Italian cyclist (d. 2008)
 June 5
 Joe Clark, 16th Prime Minister of Canada
 Margaret Drabble, English novelist
 June 6 – Louis Andriessen, Dutch composer (d. 2021)
 June 9 – Ileana Cotrubaș, Romanian soprano
 June 11 – Jackie Stewart, Scottish motor racing driver
 June 16 – Billy "Crash" Craddock, American country and rockabilly singer
 June 21 – Charles Jencks, American cultural theorist (d. 2019)
 June 22 – Ada Yonath, Israeli crystallographer
 June 26 – Osvaldo Hurtado, 34th President of Ecuador
 June 29 – Sante Gaiardoni, Italian cyclist
 June 30 – Renzo Rovatti, Italian footballer

July–August

 July 1 
 Kazi Zafar Ahmed, 8th Prime Minister of Bangladesh (d. 2015)
 Karen Black, American actress (d. 2013)
 July 4
 Abdelmajid Chetali, Tunisian footballer, manager
 Abdul Aziz Abdul Ghani, 2nd Prime Minister of Yemen (d. 2011)
 July 6 
 Mary Peters, British athlete
 Sultan bin Muhammad Al-Qasimi, sovereign ruler of the Emirate of Sharjah
 July 7 – Elena Obraztsova, Russian opera singer (d. 2015)
 July 8
 Likulia Bolongo, Congolese politician, general and Prime Minister of Zaire
 Abdelhamid Sharaf, Jordanian ambassador to the United States and Canada, 51st Prime Minister of Jordan (d. 1980)
 July 10 – Mavis Staples, African-American rhythm and blues, gospel singer, actress and civil rights activist
 July 13 – John Danielsen, Danish football midfielder
 July 14
 Karel Gott, Czech singer (d. 2019)
 Sid Haig, American actor (d. 2019)
 July 15 – Aníbal Cavaco Silva, 113th Prime Minister of Portugal, 19th President of Portugal
 July 16 – Lido Vieri, Italian footballer and manager 
 July 17 – Milva, Italian singer, stage and film actress, and television personality (d. 2021)
 July 18 – Dion DiMucci, American singer, songwriter (The Wanderer)
 July 21 – Helmut Haller, German footballer (d. 2012)
 July 22 – Gila Almagor, Israeli actress and author
 July 24 – Walt Bellamy, African-American basketball player (d. 2013)
 July 26 – John Howard, 25th Prime Minister of Australia
 July 28 – Gösta Ekman, Swedish actor, comedian, and director (d. 2017)
 July 30 – Peter Bogdanovich, American film director (The Last Picture Show) (d. 2022)
 July 31 – Susan Flannery, American soap opera actress
 August 1 – Robert James Waller, American novelist (d. 2017)
 August 2 
 Ali Mroudjaé, 9th Prime Minister of the Comoros (d. 2019)
 Wes Craven, American film director and writer (d. 2015)
 August 5 – Princess Irene of the Netherlands
 August 8 – Viorica Viscopoleanu, Romanian athlete
 August 9 – Romano Prodi, Italian politician, economist and 52nd Prime Minister of Italy
 August 11 – James Mancham, Seychellois politician, President 1976-77 (d. 2017)
 August 12
 George Hamilton, American actor
 S. Jayakumar, Singaporean politician and 4th Senior Minister of Singapore
 August 16 
 Seán Brady, Irish cardinal
 Valery Ryumin, Soviet cosmonaut (d. 2022)
 August 19
 Alan Baker, English mathematician (d. 2018)
 Ginger Baker, English drummer (d. 2019) 
 August 20 – Fernando Poe Jr., Filipino actor (d. 2004)
August 21 – Clarence Williams III, American actor (d. 2021)
 August 22 – Valerie Harper, American actress (d. 2019)
 August 23 – Fernando Luján, Mexican actor (d. 2019)
 August 27 – Bill Mulliken, American swimmer (d. 2014)
 August 29 – Joel Schumacher, American film producer and director (d. 2020)
 August 30
 Elizabeth Ashley, née Cole, American actress
 John Peel, né Ravenscroft, English disc jockey (d. 2004)

September
 

 September 1 – Lily Tomlin, American actress (Rowan and Martin's Laugh-In)
 September 5
 George Lazenby, Australian actor
 Claudette Colvin, American civil rights activist and nurse
 William Devane, American actor
 Clay Regazzoni, Swiss Formula One driver (d. 2006)
 September 6 – Susumu Tonegawa, Japanese biologist, recipient of the Nobel Prize in Physiology or Medicine
 September 7 – Stanislav Petrov, Soviet Air Defence Forces official
 September 8 – Carsten Keller, German field hockey player
 September 9 – Reuven Rivlin, 10th President of Israel
 September 11 – Charles Geschke, American inventor and businessman (d. 2021)
 September 13
 Richard Kiel, American actor (d. 2014)
 Guntis Ulmanis, 5th President of Latvia
 September 15 – Ron Walker, Australian businessman, former Lord Mayor of Melbourne (d. 2018)
 September 16 – Breyten Breytenbach, South African writer and painter
 September 18 – Jorge Sampaio, 17th President of Portugal (d. 2021)
 September 20 – Norma Cappagli, Argentine model and Miss World winner (d. 2020)
 September 22 – Junko Tabei, Japanese mountaineer (d. 2016)
 September 27 – Kathy Whitworth, American professional golfer (d. 2022)
 September 30 – Jean-Marie Lehn, French chemist, Nobel Prize laureate

October

 Date unknown - Muhammad Banaru Abubakar, Nigerian Administrator and public servant (d. 2015)
 October 4 – Ivan Mauger, New Zealand speedway rider, 6 times World Speedway Champion (d. 2018)
 October 6 - Melvyn Bragg, Baron Bragg, English broadcaster and author 
 October 7
 John Hopcroft, American computer scientist
 Clive James, Australian-born writer, humorist and television personality (d. 2019)
 Harold Kroto, English organic chemist, Nobel Prize laureate (d. 2016)
 October 8 – Paul Hogan, Australian actor and comedian
 October 9 
 Carmen Salinas, Mexican actress and politician (d. 2021)
 John Pilger, Australian-born journalist
 October 11 – Maria Bueno, Brazilian tennis player (d. 2018) 
 October 14 – Ralph Lauren, American fashion designer
 October 18 – Lee Harvey Oswald, Alleged American assassin of President John F. Kennedy (d. 1963)
 October 21 – Archbishop Christodoulos of Athens (d. 2008)
 October 22
 Joaquim Chissano, President of Mozambique
 George Cohen, English footballer (d. 2022)
 October 24  
 F. Murray Abraham, American actor (Amadeus)
Madalena Iglésias, Portuguese actress and singer (d. 2018) 
 October 27 – John Cleese, English comic actor and writer
 October 28 – Jane Alexander, American actress
 October 29 – Malay Roy Choudhury, Bengali poet, novelist and creator of the Indian Hungry generation literary and cultural movement
 October 30
 Leland H. Hartwell, American scientist, recipient of the Nobel Prize in Physiology or Medicine
 Grace Slick, American rock singer (Jefferson Airplane)
 October 31 
 Ali Farka Touré, Malian singer (d. 2006)
 Ron Rifkin, American actor

November

 November 1 – Barbara Bosson, American actress (d. 2023)
 November 6
 Athanasios Angelopoulos, Greek academic
 Carlos Emilio Morales, Cuban jazz guitarist (d. 2014)
 November 8 – Laila Kinnunen, Finnish singer (d. 2000)
 November 10 – Russell Means, Native American activist (d. 2012)
 November 14 – Wendy Carlos, American electronic composer
 November 15 – Yaphet Kotto, African-American actor (d. 2021)
 November 18
 Margaret Atwood, Canadian novelist
 Amanda Lear, French model and singer
 Brenda Vaccaro, American actress
 November 19 – Emil Constantinescu, President of Romania 
 November 25 
 Rais Khan, Pakistani sitarist (d. 2017)
 Thomas Resetarits, Austrian sculptor (d. 2022)
 November 26
 Abdullah Ahmad Badawi, 5th Prime Minister of Malaysia
 Shettima Mustafa, Nigerian politician (d. 2022)
 Tina Turner, American born Swiss singer and actress
 November 27
 Dudley Storey, New Zealand rower (d. 2017)
 Laurent-Désiré Kabila, 3rd President of the Democratic Republic of the Congo (d. 2001)
 Ulla Strömstedt, Swedish actress (d. 1986)
 November 30 – Chandra Bahadur Dangi, Nepalese dwarf, world's shortest man (d. 2015)

December

 December 1 – Lee Trevino, American professional golfer
 December 5 – Ricardo Bofill, Spanish architect (d. 2022)
 December 8
 Jerry Butler, African-American singer-songwriter and politician
 James Galway, Irish flautist
 Fahrudin Jusufi, Kosovar-Serbian footballer and coach (d. 2019)
 December 15 – Cindy Birdsong, American singer
 December 17 – Eddie Kendricks, African-American singer (The Temptations) (d. 1992)
 December 18
 Pedro Jirón, Nicaraguan footballer
 Michael Moorcock, English science fiction writer
 Harold E. Varmus, American scientist, recipient of the Nobel Prize in Physiology or Medicine
 December 26 – Phil Spector, American record producer (d. 2021)
 December 27 – John Amos, African-American actor (Good Times)

Date unknown 
Astratijs Roškovs,  former Lithuanian-Russian-Latvian footballer

Deaths

January 

 January 2 – Roman Dmowski, Polish politician (b. 1864)
January 4 – Mary J. L. Black, Canadian librarian and suffragist (b. 1879)
 January 6 – Gustavs Zemgals, 2nd President of Latvia (b. 1871)
 January 8 – Charles Eastman, American author, physician, reformer, helped found the Boy Scouts of America (b. 1858)
 January 13 – Arthur Barker, American criminal, son of Ma Barker (b. 1899)
 January 14 – Prince Valdemar of Denmark (b. 1858)
 January 15 – Kullervo Manner, Finnish Speaker of the Parliament, the Prime Minister of the FSWR and the Supreme Commander of the Red Guards (b. 1880)
 January 18 – Ivan Mosjoukine, Soviet actor (b. 1889)
 January 22 – Léopold Bernhard Bernstamm, Soviet sculptor (b. 1859)
 January 23 – Matthias Sindelar, Austrian footballer (b. 1903)
 January 24 – Maximilian Bircher-Benner, Swiss physician, nutritionist (b. 1867)
 January 25 – Helen Ware, American actress (b. 1877)
 January 28 – W. B. Yeats, Irish writer, 1923 Nobel Prize laureate (b. 1865)

February 

 February 1 – Lawrence Marston, American actor, playwright, and film director (b. 1857)
 February 2 – Vladimir Shukhov, Russian engineer, polymath, scientist and architect (b. 1853)
 February 3 – Janez Frančišek Gnidovec, Yugoslav Roman Catholic priest and venerable (b. 1873)
 February 4 – Edward Sapir, German-American anthropologist, linguist (b. 1884)
 February 5 – Teresa Mañé, Spanish teacher, editor and writer (b. 1865)
 February 6 – Sayajirao Gaekwad III, Maharada of Baroda (b. 1863)
 February 9 – Henry Balfour, British archaeologist (b. 1863)
 February 10
 Pope Pius XI (b. 1857)
 Patriarch Torkom Koushagian of Jerusalem (b. 1874)
 February 11 – Franz Schmidt, Austrian composer (b. 1874)
 February 12 
 Potenciano Gregorio, Filipino musician (b. 1880)
 S. P. L. Sørensen, Danish chemist (b. 1868)
 February 13 – Sir Alexander Hamilton-Gordon, British general (b. 1859)
 February 15 – Henri Jaspar, Belgian politician, 27th Prime Minister of Belgium (b. 1870)
 February 18 – Okamoto Kanoko, Japanese tanka poet (b. 1899)
 February 22 – Antonio Machado, Spanish poet (b. 1875)
 February 23 – Michael Knatchbull, 5th Baron Brabourne, British peer, soldier (b. 1895)
 February 26 – Ivan Fedko, Soviet army commander (b. 1897)
 February 27 – Nadezhda Krupskaya, Russian Marxist revolutionary, Vladimir Lenin's widow (b. 1869)

March 

 March 2 – Howard Carter, British archaeologist (b. 1874)
 March 3 – Dimitrie Gerota, Romanian anatomist, physician (b. 1867)
 March 5 – Herbert Mundin, British actor (b. 1898)
 March 6
 Ginepro Cocchi, Italian Roman Catholic priest and Servant of God (b. 1908)
 Patriarch Miron of Romania, Austro-Hungarian-born Romanian cleric, politician, priest and 38th Prime Minister of Romania (b. 1868)
 March 7 – Matvei Berman, Soviet intelligence officer (b. 1898)
 March 13 – Lucien Lévy-Bruhl, French sociologist, anthropologist (b. 1857)
 March 14 – Agostino Borgato, Italian actor, director (b. 1871)
 March 21 – Avril de Sainte-Croix, French author, journalist (b. 1855)
 March 23 – Abd al-Rahim al-Hajj Muhammad, Palestinian revolutionary (b. 1892)
 March 27 – Ferdinand von Quast, German general (b. 1850)
 March 28
 Carlos Manuel de Cespedes y Quesada, Cuban diplomat, politician, writer and 6th President of Cuba (b. 1871)
 Mario Lertora, Italian artistic gymnast in the 1924 Summer Olympics (b. 1897)
 March 29 – Gerardo Machado, Cuban general, 5th President of Cuba (b. 1871)
 March 31 – Ioannis Tsangaridis, Greek general (b. 1887)

April

 
 April 4
 King Ghazi of Iraq (b. 1912)
 Joaquín García Morato, Spanish fighter ace (b. 1904)
 April 7 – Joseph Lyons, 10th Prime Minister of Australia, Premier of Tasmania (b. 1879)
 April 15 – Konstantin Petrovich Grigorovich, Soviet engineer, professor (b. 1886)
 April 18 
 Ishbel Hamilton-Gordon, Marchioness of Aberdeen and Temair, British writer, philanthropist (b. 1857)
 Hugo Charlemont, Austrian painter (b. 1850)
 April 19 
 Lucilio de Albuquerque, Brazilian painter (b. 1877)
 János Vaszary, Hungarian painter and graphic artist (b. 1867)
 April 20 – Archduke Franz Salvator of Austria (b. 1866)
 April 22 – Leandro Campanari, Italian conductor, composer and violinist (b. 1859)
 April 25
 John Foulds, British classical music composer (b. 1880)
 Georges Ricard-Cordingley, French painter (b. 1873)
 April 27 – José Gola, Argentinian actor (b. 1904)
 April 28 – Archduke Leo Karl of Austria (b. 1893)

May

 May 1 – Bautista Saavedra , 29th President of Bolivia (b. 1870)
 May 2 – Phillips Smalley, American actor, director (b. 1875)
 May 3 – Wilhelm Groener, German general (b. 1867)
 May 4 – James A. Johnson, American architect (b. 1865)
 May 7 – Francesco Paleari, Italian priest and blessed (b. 1863)
 May 9 – Mary, Lady Heath, Irish aviator (b. 1896)
 May 10 – James Parrott, American actor (b. 1898)
 May 13 – Victor Bernau, Norwegian actor, director (b. 1890)
 May 18
Charles deForest Chandler, American military aviator (b. 1878)
Tang Juwu, Chinese general of the National Revolutionary Army (b. 1892)
 May 19 – Ahmet Ağaoğlu, Turkish politician, author and writer (b. 1869)
 May 20
 Joseph Carr, 2nd president of the National Football League (b. 1880)
 Alexandra Čvanová, Czechoslovakian soprano (b. 1897)
 May 22 – Ernst Toller, German playwright, Communist politician (b. 1893)
 May 23 – Witmer Stone, American ornithologist, botanist (b. 1866)
 May 24 – Aleksander Brückner, German scholar (b. 1856)
 May 25 – Álvaro Casanova Zenteno, Chilean painter (b. 1857)
 May 25 – Frank Watson Dyson, British astronomer (b. 1868)
 May 27 – Alfred A. Cunningham, American aviator, the first United States Marine Corps aviator (b. 1882)
 May 29 – Ursula Ledóchowska, Polish Roman Catholic religious professed and saint (b. 1865)
 May 30 – Floyd Roberts, American race car driver (b. 1900)

June 
 June 4 – Tommy Ladnier, American jazz trumpeter (b. 1900)
 June 6
 George Fawcett, American actor (b. 1860)
 Constantin Noe, Megleno-Romanian editor and professor (b. 1883)
 June 9 – Owen Moore, Irish-born American actor (b. 1886)
 June 15 – Nicolae M. Condiescu, Romanian novelist and general (b. 1880)
 June 16 – Chick Webb, American musician (b. 1905)
 June 17 – Eugen Weidmann, German serial killer, last person publicly executed in France (b. 1908)
 June 19 – Grace Abbott, American social worker, activist (b. 1878)
 June 22 – Benjamin Tucker, American anarchist (b. 1854)
 June 23 – Ernest Alexander Cruikshank, Canadian general (b. 1859)
 June 25 – Richard Seaman, British motor racing driver (b. 1913)
 June 26 – Ford Madox Ford, British writer (b. 1873)
 June 27 – Margaret Campbell, American actress (b. 1883)
 June 28 – Bobby Vernon, American actor (b. 1898)
 June 30 – Eduardo Lopez Bustamante, Venezuelan poet, lawyer and journalist (b. 1881)

July 

 July 3 – Juan José Gárate, Spanish painter (b. 1869)
 July 4 – Louis Wain, English artist (b. 1860)
 July 5 – Malietoa Tanumafili I, King of Samoa (b. 1879)
 July 7 – Deacon White, American baseball player, MLB Hall of Famer (b. 1847)
 July 8
 Havelock Ellis, British sexologist (b. 1859)
 Anna Pappritz, German writer, suffragist (b. 1861)
 July 9
 Carlo Chiostri, Italian painter (b. 1863)
 Alphonse Laurencic, French painter, architect (b. 1902)

 July 11 – Stiliyan Kovachev, Bulgarian general (b. 1860)
 July 14 – Alphonse Mucha, Czech painter, decorative artist (b. 1860)
 July 17 – María del Carmen González-Valerio, Spanish Roman Catholic saint (b. 1930)
 July 19 – Rose Hartwick Thorpe, American poet (b. 1850)
 July 20
 Judy Chicago, American feminist artist
 Joseph Mendes da Costa, Dutch sculptor (b. 1863)
 July 23 – Jack Duffy, American actor (b. 1882)
 July 26 – William Mackay, American artist (b. 1876)
 July 27 – Stanisław Baczyński, Polish writer, journalist and soldier (b. 1890)

August

 August 2 – Harvey Spencer Lewis, American mystic (b. 1883)
 August 6 
 Mehmet Emin Çolakoğlu, Turkish army general (b. 1878)
 Monroe Dunaway Anderson, American founder of Anderson, Clayton and Company; "Father of Texas Medical Center" (b. 1873)
 August 10 – Carlo Galimberti, Italian Olympic weightlifter (b. 1894)
 August 11 – Jean Bugatti, German automobile designer (b. 1909)
 August 12 – Eulalio Gutiérrez, President of Mexico (b. 1881)
 August 23 
 Sidney Howard, American writer (b. 1891)
 Germán Busch , 36th President of Bolivia (b. 1903)
 August 25 – Arthur Asquith, British general (b. 1883)
 August 26 – Rubén González Cárdenas, Venezuelan lawyer (b. 1875)
 August 29 – Marthe de Florian, French painter (b. 1864)
 August 31 – Richard Bouwens van der Boijen, French architect (b. 1863)

September

 September 6 – Arthur Rackham, British artist (b. 1867)
 September 8 – Swami Abhedananda, Indian mystic (b. 1866)
 September 10 – Wilhelm Fritz von Roettig, German Waffen SS general, first general killed in action during World War II (b. 1888)
 September 12
Fyodor Raskolnikov, Soviet revolutionary, writer, journalist, naval commander, and diplomat (assassinated) (b. 1892)
Eliodoro Villazón, 27th President of Bolivia (b. 1848)
 September 16
 Józef Kustroń, Polish general (killed in action) (b. 1892)
 Nikolaos Triantafyllakos, Prime Minister of Greece (b. 1855)
 Otto Wels, German politician, chairman of the Social Democratic Party of Germany (SPD) (b. 1873)
 September 18 – Stanisław Ignacy Witkiewicz, Polish writer, painter (b. 1885)
 September 20
 Paul Bruchesi, Canadian prelate (b. 1855)
 Hermann Brunn, German mathematician (b. 1862)
 Andrew Claude de la Cherois Crommelin, French astronomer (b. 1865)
 September 21 – Armand Călinescu, Romanian economist, politician and 39th Prime Minister of Romania (b. 1893)
 September 22
 Mikołaj Bołtuć, Polish army general (killed in battle) (b. 1893)
 Józef Olszyna-Wilczyński, Polish general (b. 1890)
 Werner von Fritsch, German general (killed in action) (b. 1880) 
 September 23
 Sigmund Freud, Austrian psychoanalyst (b. 1856)
 Eugeniusz Kazimirowski, Polish painter (b. 1873)
 Francisco León de la Barra, Mexican diplomat, political figure, and acting President of Mexico (b. 1863)
 September 24
 Danilo, Crown Prince of Montenegro (b. 1871)
 Carl Laemmle, German film producer (b. 1867)

October 

 October 2 – Edgar M. Lazarus, American architect (b. 1868)
 October 3 – Fay Templeton, American musical comedy star (b. 1865)
 October 6 – Giulio Gavotti, Italian aviator (b. 1882)
 October 7 – Harvey Cushing, American neurosurgeon (b. 1869)
 October 8 – Gustav Henriksen, Norwegian executive (b. 1872)
 October 13 – Ford Sterling, American actor (b. 1882)
 October 14 – Polaire, French actress (b. 1874)
 October 23
Zane Grey, American writer (b. 1872)
Liao Lei, Chinese general of the National Revolutionary Army (b. 1890)
 October 28 – Alice Brady, American actress (b. 1892)
 October 30 – Carlos De Valdez, Peruvian actor (b. 1894)
 October 31 
 Albrecht, Duke of Württemberg, German field marshal (b. 1865)
 Otto Rank, Austrian psychoanalyst (b. 1884)

November 

 November 1 – Kálmán Darányi, 31st Prime Minister of Hungary (b. 1886)
 November 4 
 Sir Percy Douglas, chairman of the British Graham Land Expedition (BGLE) Advisory Committee (b. 1876)
 Ma Xiangbo, Chinese Jesuit priest and blessed (b. 1840)
 November 7 – Kirsti Suonio, Finnish actress (b. 1872)
 November 10 – Charlotte Despard, Anglo-Irish suffragist, socialist, pacifist, Sinn Féin activist, and novelist
 November 11 – Alicja Kotowska, Polish Roman Catholic nun, martyr and blessed (b. 1899)
 November 12 – Norman Bethune, Canadian humanitarian (b. 1890)
 November 13 – Lois Weber, American actress (b. 1881)
 November 15
Platon Ivanovich Ivanov, Soviet-born Finnish civil servant (b. 1863)
 November 17 – Aurelio Mosquera, Ecuadorian politician, 25th President of Ecuador (b. 1883)
 November 21 – Émile Guépratte, French admiral (b. 1856)
 November 22 – King Daudi Cwa II of Buganda (b. 1896)
 November 24 – John Harron, American actor (b. 1903)
 November 28 – James Naismith, Canadian inventor of basketball (b. 1861) He was 78 years old.
 November 29
 Eugen Kolisko, Austrian-born German physician, educator (b. 1893)
 Józef Krasnowolski, Polish painter (b. 1879)
 Philipp Scheidemann, German politician, 11th Chancellor of Germany (b. 1865)

December 

 December 3 – Princess Louise, Duchess of Argyll, second youngest daughter of Queen Victoria (b. 1848)
 December 5 – Santiago Iglesias, Puerto Rican statesman (b. 1872)
 December 8 
 Alimondo Ciampi, Italian sculptor (b. 1876)
 Jean Grave, French anarchist (b. 1854)
 December 12 – Douglas Fairbanks, American actor, father of Douglas Fairbanks Jr. (b. 1883)
 December 14 – Helene Kröller-Müller, Dutch museum founder and art collector (b. 1869)
 December 16 – Juan Demóstenes Arosemena, 18th President of Panama (b. 1879)
 December 18 – Bruno Liljefors, Swedish artist (b. 1860)
 December 19
 Dmitry Grave, Soviet mathematician (b. 1863)
 Reginald F. Nicholson, United States Navy admiral (b. 1852)
 December 20 – Hans Langsdorff, German naval officer (suicide) (b. 1894)
 December 22 – Ma Rainey, African-American blues singer (b. 1886)
 December 23
 Anthony Fokker, Dutch-born American aircraft manufacturer (b. 1890)
 Maxime Laubeuf, French maritime engineer (b. 1864)
 December 24 – Walter Gordon, German physicist (b. 1893)
 December 25 – Ivan Dmitriyevich Borisov, Soviet aircraft pilot (b. 1913)
 December 27 – Rinaldo Cuneo, American artist ("the painter of San Francisco") (b. 1877)
 December 31 – Sir Frank Benson, British actor (b. 1858)

Nobel Prizes 

 Physics – Ernest Lawrence
 Chemistry – Adolf Friedrich Johann Butenandt, Leopold Ružička
 Physiology or Medicine – Gerhard Domagk
 Literature – Frans Eemil Sillanpää
 Peace – not awarded

References

External links
 1939 WWII Timeline 
 The 1930s Timeline: 1939 – from American Studies Programs at The University of Virginia
 Paula Phelan, 1939 Into The Dark, 2009, ZAPmedia.